Geri Doran was born in Kalispell, Montana in 1966.  Doran has attended Vassar College, the University of Cambridge, the University of Florida (MFA 1995), and Stanford University, where she held a Wallace Stegner Fellowship in Poetry.  She lives in Eugene, Oregon where she is an Assistant Professor of Creative Writing at the University of Oregon.

Awards
2012 Oregon Arts Commission Fellowship
2005 Amy Lowell Poetry Travelling Scholarship
2005 Bread Loaf Writers' Conference Fellowship
2004 Academy of American Poets Walt Whitman Award
2001 Wallace Stegner Fellowship in Poetry from Stanford University
1999 Literary Arts, Inc. Poetry Fellowship

Works
Retrospective (The Atlantic, 2005)
Resin, poems (Louisiana State University Press, 2005)
Sanderlings, poems (Tupelo Press, 2011)
The Good Field

References

External links
 Academy of American Poets Author Page
 University of Oregon Faculty Page

1966 births
Living people
Alumni of the University of Cambridge
Vassar College alumni
Stanford University alumni
University of Florida alumni
University of Oregon faculty
People from Pacifica, California
American women poets
21st-century American poets
American women academics
21st-century American women writers